The year 2002 is the sixth year in the history of M-1 Global, a mixed martial arts promotion based in Russia. In 2002 M-1 Global held 3 events beginning with, M-1 MFC: European Championship 2002.

Events list

M-1 MFC: European Championship 2002

M-1 MFC: European Championship 2002 was an event held on February 15, 2002 at The Palace of Sport "Jubileiny" in Saint Petersburg, Russia.

Results

M-1 MFC: Russia vs. the World 3

M-1 MFC: Russia vs. the World 3 was an event held on April 26, 2002 in Saint Petersburg, Russia.

Results

M-1 MFC: Russia vs. the World 4

M-1 MFC: Russia vs. the World 4 was an event held on November 15, 2002 at The Palace of Sport in Saint Petersburg, Russia.

Results

See also 
 M-1 Global

References

M-1 Global events
2002 in mixed martial arts